Daniel Macmillan may refer to:

 Daniel MacMillan (1813–1867), Scottish publisher
 Daniel Macmillan, Viscount Macmillan of Ovenden (born 1974), British fashion designer

See also 
 Daniel McMillan (disambiguation)